HMCS Nanaimo is a  that has served in the Canadian Forces and Royal Canadian Navy since 1997. Nanaimo is the third ship of her class. She is the second vessel to use the designation . She is assigned to Joint Task Force Pacific (formerly Maritime Forces Pacific) and is homeported at CFB Esquimalt.

Design and description
The Kingston class was designed to fill the minesweeper, coastal patrol and reserve training needs of the Canadian Forces, replacing the s, s and Royal Canadian Mounted Police coastal launches in those roles. In order to perform these varied duties the Kingston-class vessels are designed to carry up to three  ISO containers with power hookups on the open deck aft in order to embark mission-specific payloads. The seven module types available for embarkation include four route survey, two mechanical minesweeping and one bottom inspection modules.

The coastal defence vessels are powered by four Jeumont ANR-53-50 alternators coupled to four Wärtsilä UD 23V12 diesel engines creating . Two LIPS Z-drive azimuth thrusters are driven by two Jeumont CI 560L motors creating  and the Z drives can be rotated 360°.

The Kingston class is equipped with a Kelvin Hughes navigational radar using the I band and a Kelvin Hughes 6000 surface search radar scanning the E and F bands. The vessels carry an AN/SQS-511 towed side scan sonar for minesweeping and a Remote-control Mine Hunting System (RMHS). The vessels are equipped with one Bofors 40 mm/60 calibre Mk 5C gun and two M2 machine guns. The Kingston-class coastal defence vessels have a complement of 37. The 40 mm gun was declared obsolete and removed from the vessels in 2014. Some of them ended up as museum pieces and on display at naval reserve installations across Canada.

Operational history
The ship's keel was laid down on 11 August 1995 by Halifax Shipyards Ltd. at Halifax, Nova Scotia and was launched on 17 May 1996. Nanaimo was commissioned into the Canadian Forces on 10 May 1997 at Nanaimo, British Columbia and carries the hull number MM 702.

After commissioning, Nanaimo was assigned to the west coast. In June 2002, she participated in the naval exercise RIMPAC 2002. As part of Operation Caribbe, she patrolled the eastern Pacific Ocean with sister ship  in February 2014. The coastal defence vessel once again participated in RIMPAC in 2014, as part of the units operating off Southern California. After the 40 mm gun was declared obsolete in 2014, Nanaimos model was donated to the Vancouver Island Military Museum and positioned near the museum entrance.

In February 2015, Nanaimo was deployed as part of Operation Caribbe. On 10 March, Nanaimo came across 50  packets of cocaine floating in the ocean. She returned to Canada on 15 April 2015. Nanaimo departed Esquimalt on 28 September 2017 and sailed to San Diego, California to embark a United States Coast Guard Law Enforcement Detachment (LEDET) before beginning patrols associated with Operation Caribbe in the Eastern Pacific on 16 October. On 31 October, Nanaimo intercepted a suspect vessel and her LEDET unit boarded the boat, seizing  of cocaine. Nanaimo intercepted a further  of cocaine in the following weeks. Nanaimo returned to Esquimalt on 15 December.

In November 2018, Nanaimo and sister ship  departed for the Eastern Pacific Ocean to participate in Operation Caribbe in November 2018. The two ships returned to Esquimalt on 17 December, with Edmonton successfully intercepting a drug shipment. Nanaimo deployed from Esquimalt with Whitehorse on 10 February 2020 for Operation Caribbe off western Central America for three months. The two ships were recalled from their mission early on 19 March due to the COVID-19 pandemic.

References

Notes

Citations

Sources

External links

 HMCS Nanaimo (MM 702) – official website

Fleet of the Royal Canadian Navy
Kingston-class coastal defence vessels
1996 ships
Ships built in Nova Scotia